Neoguraleus benthicolus is a species of sea snail, a marine gastropod mollusk in the family Mangeliidae.

Description
The length of the shell attains 8 mm, its diameter 3 mm.

Distribution
This marine species is endemic to New Zealand and occurs off South Island.

References

 Powell, Arthur William Baden. The New Zealand Recent and Fossil Mollusca of the Family Turridae: With General Notes on Turrid Nomenclature and Systematics. No. 2. Unity Press limited, printers, 1942.
 Powell, A.W.B. 1979: New Zealand Mollusca: Marine, Land and Freshwater Shells, Collins, Auckland (p. 239)
 Spencer, H.G., Marshall, B.A. & Willan, R.C. (2009). Checklist of New Zealand living Mollusca. pp 196–219. in: Gordon, D.P. (ed.) New Zealand inventory of biodiversity. Volume one. Kingdom Animalia: Radiata, Lophotrochozoa, Deuterostomia. Canterbury University Press, Christchurch.

External links
  Tucker, J.K. 2004 Catalog of recent and fossil turrids (Mollusca: Gastropoda). Zootaxa 682:1-1295.
 New Zealand Mollusca: Neoguraleus benthicolus
 Spencer H.G., Willan R.C., Marshall B.A. & Murray T.J. (2011). Checklist of the Recent Mollusca Recorded from the New Zealand Exclusive Economic Zone.

benthicolus
Gastropods described in 1942
Gastropods of New Zealand